The 2000 FIFA World Player of the Year award was won by Zinedine Zidane for the second time following France's 2000 European Championship win. The gala was hosted at the Television Studio in Rome, on December 11, 2000. 150 national team coaches, based on the current FIFA Men's World Ranking were chosen to vote. It was organised by European Sports Media, Adidas, FIFA and the Italian newspaper Gazzetta dello Sport.

Results

References

See also

FIFA World Player of the Year
FIFA World Player of the Year